"Chain Reaction" is a song by American singer Diana Ross, released on November 12, 1985, as the second single from her sixteenth studio album, Eaten Alive (1985). The song was written by the Bee Gees and contains additional vocals from Barry Gibb. Sonically, "Chain Reaction" is an R&B and dance-pop song. According to the Gibbs' biography, the brothers had initial reservations about offering the song to Ross in case it was too Motown-like for her. 

The single became Ross's second No. 1 hit in the UK Singles Chart. It also hit No. 1 in Australia, where it became the best selling single of 1986, Ireland, and Zimbabwe. In New Zealand, it peaked at No. 3 and it made the top 5 in South Africa. In 1993, the song broke the UK top 20 again (also breaking the top 40 in the Republic of Ireland and France) when it was re-released to commemorate her 30th anniversary in show business. The song fared poorly in the US, where it initially peaked at a disappointing No. 95 on the Billboard Hot 100 late in 1985. A few months later, a remixed version of the song was issued as a single (Ross performed this version of the song on the American Music Awards, which she hosted that year). The new version re-entered the chart and performed better, but with diminished momentum, it stalled at No. 66 on the Billboard Hot 100 and No. 77 on the Cash Box Top 100.

Music video
At the beginning of the accompanying music video for "Chain Reaction" in black-and-white, Ross enters a TV studio and proceeds to perform the song in front of dancing spectators in a '60s-style live TV. The performance is intercut with a view from the station control room where producers are shown additional scenes appearing in color, confounding them on where the scenes are coming from. Half-way through Ross is walking up a desolate street with barrels of fire littered around and dancers in the background. Careful lighting and fog help create the effect Ross is performing on a real street. It is the only time the street is shown and the video eventually returns to the TV studio performance. The final style of scene has Ross performing in what is supposed to be the glamorous front exterior of the TV studio. A quick shot of the control room is shown with the lead producing yelling in shock or frustration, before the scene continues. It's assumed the producers have lost control of the broadcast. The video ends with intercuts of the TV performance, the exterior, and the control room. The band finishes in the black and white scenes of their show, dancing with the audience and using a combination of both color scenes. A producer gets in a cab from a nervous breakdown.

Charts

Weekly charts

Year-end charts

Certifications and sales

"Chain Reaction '93"

In 1993, Diana Ross released "Chain Reaction '93".  Producing the remix herself, the single was also successful in the United Kingdom.  This version's purely instrumental sound differs it from the original. A music video was not recorded for the song.

Track listing
 CD single
Chain Reaction '93 - 3:47	
Upside Down - 4:07

 12-inch UK remix single
"Chain Reaction" (Original 12" Version) - 6:50
"Chain Reaction" (Reaction Dub, remix by E-Smoove) - 6:34 
"Chain Reaction" (Low End Mix, remix by Dewey B and Spike) - 6:15 
"Chain Reaction" (Low End Dub, remix by Dewey B and Spike) - 6:15 
"Chain Reaction" (Smoove Reaction Instrumental, remix by E-Smoove) - 8:40

 French 2-track CD single
Original Single Version - 3:47
'93 Remix

 Italian 12-inch
"Chain Reaction" (Original Single Version) - 3:47
"Love Hangover" (Tribal Hangover - remix and additional production by Frankie Knuckles for Def Mix Productions) - 9:31
"Upside Down" ('93 Remix - Remix and additional production by Satoshi Tomiie and David Morales for Def Mix Productions.) - 8:09
"Upside Down" (Dub 2 - Remix and additional production by Satoshi Tomiie and David Morales for Def Mix Productions.) - 7:37
"Someday We'll Be Together" ('93 Remix - Remix and additional production by Frankie Knuckles for Def Mix Productions)  - 8:45

Charts

Steps version

British pop group Steps covered "Chain Reaction" and released it as a single on September 24, 2001. The song reached number two on the UK Singles Chart, behind Kylie Minogue's "Can't Get You Out of My Head".

Music video
The first scene is two paramedics lifting a patient from the ambulance onto the ground on a stretcher. H is the patient and Lee is one of the paramedics. Then, Lee pushes H into the hospital. The next scene is a receptionist and this turns out to be Claire. She sings her verse. Then, the camera goes over to a nurse who is Faye. She sings her verse. Then, the camera follows Faye over to Lee and H. We now know that Faye loves Lee so she touches his hand. Then Faye calls Claire over and they start making their way over to the operating theatre. Lee then calls a doctor over which turns out to be Lisa. We now also know that Lisa loves H.

The next scene is H singing his verse while the others are acting their parts. Then, Lisa sings her verse and then Faye holds the operating camera and the light shines into the camera. 

The entire video up to this point was recorded in a single continuous long take.

At this point Steps are seen in a change of clothes which are brown and white. We also see them dancing. They have close up shots and are each seen with a particular piece of furniture. Claire appears with a corner sofa. Faye appears on a furry staircase. Lee appears with a set of five dining chairs. Lisa appears with three tall pillar lamps, while H appears with a high back armchair. The video ends with Steps close together singing the last line of the song. The video was filmed at Greenwich Hospital and a studio in London.

Track listings
 UK CD1 and cassette single, Australasian CD single
 "Chain Reaction" – 3:56
 "One for Sorrow" (Tony Moran US remix) – 3:29
 "Stop Me from Loving You" – 3:45

 UK CD2
 "Chain Reaction" (Graham Stack extended mix) – 6:28
 "One for Sorrow" (Tony Moran extended club mix) – 6:38
 "One for Sorrow" (Sleazesisters 12-inch Anthem mix) – 6:48
 "One for Sorrow" (promotional video) – 3:56

 European CD single
 "Chain Reaction" – 3:56
 "One for Sorrow" (Tony Moran US remix) – 3:29

Personnel
 Claire Richards – lead and backing vocals
 Lisa Scott-Lee – lead and backing vocals
 Faye Tozer – lead and backing vocals
 Ian "H" Watkins – lead and backing vocals
 Lee Latchford-Evans – backing vocals

Charts

Weekly charts

Year-end charts

Certifications

Release history

Other cover versions

The Shadows did an instrumental version on Simply Shadows (1987).
Cliff Richard did a cover with Steps in 2001 on the ITV show Cliff Richard: The Hits I Missed.
 Australian group Young Divas recorded a cover of the song for their second album New Attitude, released in 2007.
 Swedish pop-dance singer Daniela Vecchia recorded cover of the song and released it as a stand-alone CD single in January 2010.
UK car insurance comparison site Confused.com covered the song on a 2011 advert starring Louise Dearman.

See also
List of UK Singles Chart number ones of the 1980s

References

1985 singles
1986 singles
1993 singles
2001 singles
Steps (group) songs
Bee Gees songs
Diana Ross songs
Number-one singles in Australia
Irish Singles Chart number-one singles
UK Singles Chart number-one singles
UK Independent Singles Chart number-one singles
Dance-pop songs
Songs written by Barry Gibb
Songs written by Maurice Gibb
Songs written by Robin Gibb
Song recordings produced by Barry Gibb
1985 songs
Song recordings produced by Albhy Galuten
RCA Records singles
Capitol Records singles
Motown singles
Jive Records singles
Pete Waterman Entertainment singles